SoulFly is the third studio album by American rapper Rod Wave. It was released on March 26, 2021, through Alamo Records. The album features a sole guest appearance from Polo G. The deluxe edition of the album was released on August 20, 2021. It features additional guest appearances from Kodak Black and Lil Durk. The album continues Rod Wave's signature "tenacity for poignant and evocative storytelling".

Background
In August 2020, during an interview with Billboard, Rod Wave said he would release his third album that same month. However, a deluxe edition of Pray 4 Love was released instead. In late January 2021, he took to Instagram, revealing the album's cover art, while calling out his label for reportedly not paying him, and stated he would not release new music until they do so. Days later, he returned to Instagram, apologizing to his label, assuring fans "we just figured it out everything cool", and revealed that the album would be released in a couple of weeks.

Concept 
The album continues Rod Wave's candid emotional subject matters about his life and upbringing; "a story of a man scarred from his experiences with his family's struggles and racial disparities". The Faders Jordan Darville noted: "SoulFly is something like an intense conversation, with Wave's passion and ear for beats makes the listener connect their own life with what Wave is sharing. Whether that's turmoil or flexing, Wave makes his heart's concerns sound universal". Billboards Jason Lipshutz deemed the album Rod Wave's "most authoritative project to date, a collection of passionate stories coiled around melodies that are croaked out, rapped and crooned". Rod Wave initially did not plan to have any features on the album. However, he changed his mind after meeting Polo G at a jewelry store; Polo had told him he is a fan of his work, much to Rod's surprise.

Critical reception

Uproxx's Aaron Williams praised Rod Wave's vocals for being the foundation of his music: "It's impressive that there are still artists who can do it with just a voice. While there's not a tremendous amount of true introspection or innovation on SoulFly, there is, however, a supreme level of self-assurance and technical craftsmanship. What Rod lacks in wit he makes up in emotion, and where his stories lack detail, he imbues them with a powerful sincerity that makes them read just as truthfully, resonating as deeply as an impressionist portrait". Kazi Magazine found the album consistent: "Beautiful composed beats assist Rod's voice like a pass from LeBron James. It's a case of modern production not overpowering the vocals of the artist. Not only that it was no skips but it was meaningful content".

Chart performance
SoulFly was the most pre-saved album on Apple Music for two weeks.

On release, SoulFly debuted at number one on the US Billboard 200 with 130,000 album-equivalent units (including 4,000 pure album sales) in its first week. It is Wave's first album to top the Billboard 200.

Track listing

Charts

Weekly charts

Year-end charts

Certifications

References

2021 albums
Rod Wave albums